The Khurana cabinet was the Council of Ministers in first Delhi Legislative Assembly headed by Chief Minister Madan Lal Khurana.

Council members
 Harsh Vardhan - Health, Education, Law & Justice & Legislative Affairs minister
 Sahib Singh Verma
 Lal Bihari Tiwari
 Harsharan Singh Balli - Industry, Labour, Jails, Languages and Gurudwara Administration

References

Cabinets established in 1993
1993 establishments in Delhi
Delhi cabinets
Bharatiya Janata Party state ministries
1996 disestablishments in India
Cabinets disestablished in 1996